CTSU may refer to:
 Clinical Trial Service Unit at Oxford University
 Cancer Trials Support Unit, a service of the U.S. National Cancer Institute